The 2006 McDonald's All-American Girls Game was an All-star basketball game played on Wednesday, March 29, 2006 at the Cox Arena in San Diego, California, home of the San Diego State Aztecs. The game's rosters featured the best and most highly recruited high school girls graduating in 2006.  The game was the 5th annual version of the McDonald's All-American Game first played in 2002.

The 48 players were selected from 2,500 nominees by a committee of basketball experts. They were chosen not only for their on-court skills, but for their performances off the court as well. Coach Morgan Wootten, who had more than 1,200 wins as head basketball coach at DeMatha High School, was chairman of the selection committee. Legendary UCLA coach John Wooden, who has been involved in the McDonald's All American Games since its inception, served as chairman of the Games and as an advisor to the selection committee.

Proceeds from the 2006 McDonald's All American High School Basketball Games went to Ronald McDonald House Charities (RMHC) of San Diego and its Ronald McDonald House program.

2006 Game
The game was telecast live by ESPN.  Fans swarmed San Diego State’s Cox Arena for the 2006 edition of the McDonald's All American Games. A sold out crowd of 11,900 was treated to a tightly contested first game, as the Girls game kicked off the action.

Morgan Wooten Player of the Year award recipient and East Team superstar Tina Charles (Connecticut) turned in a strong performance
with 12 points and nine rebounds.  But the night’s star and John R. Wooden Most Valuable Player of the Game was the West Team’s Jayne Appel (Stanford) with 12 points, seven rebounds and a great all-around performance. Dymond Simon (Arizona State) added a great offensive performance with her game high 14 points, while Amanda Thompson (Oklahoma) led the way defensively with five blocked shots. The West Team was coached by Wade Vickery of Santana High School (Santee, CA) and the East Team was headed by coaching legend Leta Andrews of Granbury High School (Granbury, TX) who became the all-time winningest girls coach in 2006.

The 2006 edition of the Girls game went down to the wire and the 80-76 margin makes it the closest contest to date. After trailing at the half, the West team put together a strong second half performance to pull out another victory, as they led the series 4-1.

2006 East Roster

2006 West Roster

Coaches
The East team was coached by:
 Head Coach Leta Andrews of Granbury High School (Granbury, Texas)
 Asst Coach Shelley Rains of Country Day School (Fort Worth, Texas)
 Asst Coach Dianna Reynolds Sager of Colleyville Heritage High School (Colleyville, Texas)

The West team was coached by:
 Head Coach Wade Vickery of Santana High School (Santee, California)
 Asst Coach Jim Mottershaw of Santana High School (Santee, California)
 Asst Coach Peggy Brose of Rancho Bernardo High School (San Diego, California)

Boxscore

Visitors: East

Home: West 

(* = Starting Line-up)

All-American Week

Schedule 

 Monday, March 27: Powerade JamFest
 Three-Point Shoot-out
 Timed Basketball Skills Competition
 Wednesday, March 29: 5th Annual Girls All-American Game

The Powerade JamFest is a skills-competition evening featuring basketball players who demonstrate their skills in two crowd-entertaining ways.  Since the first All-American game in 2002, players have competed in a 3-point shooting challenge and a timed basketball skills competition.

Contest Winners 
 Allison Hightower was winner of the 2006 3-point shoot-out.
 The skills competition was won by Michelle Harrison.

See also
 2006 McDonald's All-American Boys Game

References

External links
McDonald's All-American on the web

2006 in American women's basketball
2006